Nicholas Ellsworth Worthington (March 30, 1836 – March 4, 1916) was a U.S. Representative from Illinois.

Born in Brooke County, Virginia (now West Virginia), Worthington was graduated from Allegheny College, Meadville, Pennsylvania.
He studied law.
He was admitted to the bar in 1860 and commenced practice in Peoria, Illinois.
Superintendent of schools of Peoria County 1865-1872.
He served as member of the state board of education 1869-1872.

Worthington was elected as a Democrat to the Forty-eighth and Forty-ninth Congresses (March 4, 1883 – March 3, 1887).
He was an unsuccessful candidate for reelection in 1886 to the Fiftieth Congress and for election in 1888 to the Fifty-first Congress.
He resumed the practice of law.

Worthington was elected circuit judge of the tenth judicial district of Illinois in 1891.
He was reelected in 1897, and served until his retirement June 15, 1915.
He was appointed by President Cleveland a member of the commission to investigate labor strikes in 1894.
He died in Peoria, Illinois, March 4, 1916.
He was interred in Springdale Cemetery.

References

1836 births
1916 deaths
People from Brooke County, West Virginia
School superintendents in Illinois
Illinois lawyers
Illinois state court judges
Politicians from Peoria, Illinois
Democratic Party members of the United States House of Representatives from Illinois
19th-century American politicians
Allegheny College alumni
19th-century American judges